Cossus ziliante is a moth in the family Cossidae. It is found in Suriname.

References

Natural History Museum Lepidoptera generic names catalog

Cossus
Moths described in 1782
Moths of South America